Appellate Tribunal for Electricity  is created  as a statutory and autonomous body under the Electricity Act, 2003 to hear complaints, appeals or original petitions against the orders of the State Regulatory Commission, The Central Regulatory Commission, Joint Commission or the Adjudicating officer.

History 

Appellate Tribunal for Electricity was formed under the Electricity Act, 2003 to hear complaints or appeals relating to orders issued by adjudicating officer or the Central Regulatory Commission and State Electricity Regulatory Commissions in the year 2005. Any order passed by  The Appellate Tribunal for Electricity is appealable  before the Hon’ble Supreme Court of India if the issue is related to substantial questions of law.

Composition 

The Chairperson of Appellate Tribunal for Electricity should be sitting or retired judge of high court or Supreme court. The group of eminent members selected from all professions of life is formed to choose the Chairperson and members of the Tribunal.

Appellate Tribunal for Electricity includes one judicial and two technical members.

Justice Ramesh Ranganathan is the judicial member and Chairperson since 02.12.2022, Mr. Sandesh Kumar Sharma is the technical member for electricity since 16.09.2021 and Dr. Ashutosh Karnatak is the Technical Member for Petroleum and Natural Gas since 22.05.2020.

The period of service will be three years or attaining age of super annuation or issuance of orders for the appointment of new Chairman.

Powers 

Following are powers 

 Any order of the Adjudicating officer or The Central Regulatory Commission or State Regulatory Commission or Joint Commission is appealable or petition against the same can be filed. 

 Direct the central and state governments on the performance of their statutory duties.

Related articles 

 State Electricity Regulatory Commission (India)

References

External links 
 Official Website

Indian Tribunals